

The Goodyear RS-1 was the first American semi-rigid airship which was designed by Goodyear chief aeronautical engineer and inventor, Herman Theodore Kraft with the Goodyear Tire and Rubber Company for the United States Army Air Service in the late 1920s. Goodyear built only one airship of this type.

Design and development
The main components  of the RS-1 were assembled at the Goodyear hangar at Wingfoot Lake in Suffield, Ohio in 1924. The airship was designed by Goodyear engineer and inventor, Herman Theodore Kraft. Components for the dirigible were shipped to Scott Field, Illinois for assembly. The first flight was delayed due to an error made during erection and eventually took place on 8 January 1926, lasting just over an hour with a crew of eight men. A  enclosed control car was suspended from the keel at the nose. The control car included sleeping accommodations and a radio compartment. Equipment included a bombing cockpit and the ability to carry  of bombs, as well as mounts for machine guns on each side at the forward end of the car.

Operators

United States Army Air Service

Specifications

See also
 Roma (airship)
United States Army airships
Zeppelin NT, a trio of which are American-based (2010s)

References

RS-1
Airships of the United States
1920s United States experimental aircraft